Robert Alexander Blackwell (born June 27, 1970) is a retired American professional basketball player, who had a brief stint with the Los Angeles Lakers of the NBA. A 6'6", 250 lb forward born in Toms River, New Jersey, he attended Monmouth College (now Monmouth University) in West Long Branch, New Jersey.

Raised in Toms River, New Jersey, Blackwell played at Toms River High School North before transferring to Oak Hill Academy for his senior year.

During the 1992–93 NBA season, Blackwell was used sparingly by the Lakers, playing 27 games, averaging 1.3 points and 0.9 rebounds per game.

References

External links
NBA stats @ basketballreference.com

1970 births
Living people
African-American basketball players
American expatriate basketball people in Argentina
American expatriate basketball people in Chile
American expatriate basketball people in Colombia
American expatriate basketball people in Spain
American expatriate basketball people in Turkey
American expatriate basketball people in Uruguay
American expatriate basketball people in Venezuela
American men's basketball players
Basketball players from New Jersey
Cangrejeros de Santurce basketball players
CB Murcia players
Connecticut Pride players
Fort Wayne Fury players
Guaiqueríes de Margarita players
Liga ACB players
Libertad de Sunchales basketball players
Los Angeles Lakers players
Monmouth Hawks men's basketball players
Omaha Racers players
Rockford Lightning players
Sportspeople from Toms River, New Jersey
Toms River High School North alumni
Undrafted National Basketball Association players
Universiade gold medalists for the United States
Universiade medalists in basketball
Yakima Sun Kings players
Small forwards
Medalists at the 1991 Summer Universiade
Oak Hill Academy (Mouth of Wilson, Virginia) alumni
21st-century African-American sportspeople
20th-century African-American sportspeople